Danaë was the mother of Perseus in Greek mythology.

Danaë or Danae may also refer to:

Paintings
Danaë (Blanchard), two paintings attributed to Jacques Blanchard
Danaë (Correggio) (c. 1531)
Danae (Artemisia Gentileschi) (c. 1612)
Danaë (Orazio Gentileschi) (c. 1623)
Danaë (Klimt painting) (1907)
Danaë (Rembrandt painting) (1636)
Danaë (Tintoretto) (1570) 
Danaë (Titian series), a series of at least five paintings

Astronomy
61 Danaë, an asteroid
a name proposed in 1973 for Carme, a satellite of Jupiter

Biology
 Danae (plant), a genus of plants
 Danae (beetle), a genus of beetles

Ships
 Danae-class cruiser, a class of Royal Navy light cruisers
 HMS Danae, multiple ships
 French frigate Danaé (1807)

People
 Danae Kara (born 1953), Greek classical concert pianist and educator
 Danae Sweetapple (born 1967), Australian Paralympic swimmer

Other uses
 Cyclone Danae, in January 1975
 Die Liebe der Danae, an opera by Richard Strauss
 Danae, a play by Livius Andronicus
 Danae Pyle, a character in the comic strip Non Sequitur

See also
 Danaus
 Danaea
 Dana (disambiguation)